The World Senior Pairs Championship is one of the competitions held as part of the quadrennial World Bridge Championships (formerly World Pairs Olympiad), inaugurated at the 8th rendition of the meet in 1990. 

Prior to 2005 both members of each pair had to be at least 55 years of age. In 2005, the World Bridge Federation (WBF) decided that the minimum age for a player to be recognized as Senior would be increasing one year per year, until it reached 60 years in 2010. The decision ensured that 55-year-olds who participated in a senior event in 2003 would never become ex-Seniors.

Results

World meets commonly run for 15 days on a schedule whose details vary.

In 2006 the Senior Pairs played Tuesday to Friday, the 11th to 14th days of the meet, after completion of all teams competition for seniors. There were eight sessions with 103 pairs on the first two days, 98 on the third, and 88 on the fourth.

In seven renditions of the Senior Pairs through 2014, no player has won more than one medal.

The 2014 silver and bronze medalists Lall–Milner and Kowalski–Romanski were two of three pairs that won the World Senior Teams Championship in the same meet, along with Michel Bessis–Philippe Cronier.

See also
 World Open Pairs Championship

Notes

References

External links
 Senior Bridge program overview at the World Bridge Federation
 World Senior Pairs Championship 1990–present (table) at the World Bridge Federation

Senior Pairs
Senior sports competitions